Sarv-e Nav-e Sofla (also Romanized as Sarv-e Nāv-e Soflá; also known as Sarv-e Now, Sarv-e Now-ye Soflá, Sarv Now, Sarwanow, and Sirvanu) is a village in Sar Firuzabad Rural District, Firuzabad District, Kermanshah County, Kermanshah Province, Iran. At the 2006 census, its population was 615, in 138 families.

References 

Populated places in Kermanshah County